Florence Rood (1873–1944) was an American schoolteacher and trade unionist from Saint Paul, Minnesota. She served as the second president of the American Federation of Teachers from 1924 to 1926, which made her the first woman president of an AFL-affiliated union that included both men and women members. In 1922, she became the first woman to preside over a meeting of the Saint Paul Trades and Labor Assembly.

References

1873 births
1944 deaths
American women trade unionists
Schoolteachers from Minnesota
People from Saint Paul, Minnesota
Presidents of the American Federation of Teachers